Memory Songs is a 1955 album by Jo Stafford and Gordon MacRae.

Track listing 

 "Long, Long, Ago"      
 "Juanita"
 "In the Gloaming"
 "Last Night"
 "Stars of the Summer Night"
 "Sweet and Low"
 "Love's Old Sweet Song"   
 "Now the Day Is Over" 
 "Wunderbar"
 "Need You" 
 "Whispering Hope"
 "Beyond the Sunset"

References 

1955 albums
Jo Stafford albums
Capitol Records albums
Gordon MacRae albums
Vocal duet albums
Albums conducted by Paul Weston